Logan is an unincorporated community in Beaver County, Oklahoma, United States. Logan had its own post office until it closed on June 8, 1996.

References

Unincorporated communities in Beaver County, Oklahoma
Unincorporated communities in Oklahoma